is a Japanese politician of the Liberal Democratic Party, a former member of the House of Representatives in the Diet (national legislature). A native of Asahikawa on Hokkaido and graduate of Chuo University, he was elected to the first of his two terms in the city assembly of Asahikawa in 1975, to the first of his two terms in the Hokkaido Prefectural Assembly in 1983 and finally to the House of Representatives for the first time in 1990. Imazu is affiliated to the revisionist lobby Nippon Kaigi. After failing to win a seat in the 2017 Japanese general election he retired from politics. His son is Hirosuke Imazu, who became the mayor of Asahikawa in 2021.

References

External links 
 Official website in Japanese.

1946 births
Living people
People from Asahikawa
Chuo University alumni
Members of the House of Representatives (Japan)
Liberal Democratic Party (Japan) politicians
21st-century Japanese politicians
Japanese municipal councilors
Politicians from Hokkaido
Members of Nippon Kaigi
Members of the Hokkaido Prefectural Assembly